Carol Stuart Watson (August 14, 1931 – January 19, 1986) was an American illustrator and publisher. She was known for her illustrations of calendars, cards, children's books and scientific subjects. As a publisher, she cofounded The Georgetowner and Carriage Trade Publications.

She lived in Rockville and died from lung cancer at the Bethesda Naval Medical Center.

Early life and education
Watson was born at Georgetown Hospital in Washington D.C. and grew up in Bethesda, Maryland. She graduated from Bethesda-Chevy Chase High School. She went on to earn a bachelor's degree in fine arts and journalism from the University of Maryland.

Career 
Watson started her career working at the Times-Herald. In 1954 she co-founded The Georgetowner, a community newspaper in the Georgetown area of Washington D.C. In 1960 she co-founded Carriage Trade Publications with her husband, David Deshler Watson.

Her illustrations could be seen anywhere from the lobby's of companies like Martin Marietta, to the National Park Visitors Center in Harper’s Ferry, WV to the maps of local communities. She was most well known for her illustrations that appeared in books like  Where’s Rachel, Hurrah for Arthur! A Mount Vernon Birthday Party, Flower Fables, Hey, ey-ey-Lock – Adventures on the C&O Canal and Upstairs and Downstairs in a Victorian Doll House.

Watson and her husband ran Carriage Trade Publications until 1979 when she took a position as an illustrator for the Johns Hopkins University Applied Physics Laboratory.

Honors 
Watson won the Printing Industries of America, Graphic Arts Award Competition in 1982 for her design of Bear Branches Gift Wrap for the Evergreen Press.

Bibliography 
 Upstairs & Downstairs In A Victorian Dolls' House (1975)
 Flower Fables (1978)
 Hurrah for Arthur! A Mount Vernon Birthday Party (1982)

References

External links
Carol Stuart Watson short documentary
Collection of the work of Carol Stuart Watson

1931 births
1986 deaths
American illustrators
American publishers (people)
Bethesda-Chevy Chase High School alumni
Deaths from cancer in Maryland
People from Washington, D.C.
University of Maryland, College Park alumni